Konstantin Vladimirovich Titov (born 13 September 1987) is a Russian football player.

Club career
He made his debut in the Russian Football National League for FC Metallurg Lipetsk on 11 July 2021 in a game against FC Tom Tomsk.

References

External links
 
 Profile by Russian Football National League

1987 births
People from Yelets
Sportspeople from Lipetsk Oblast
Living people
Russian footballers
Association football defenders
FC Oryol players
FC Metallurg Lipetsk players
Russian Second League players
Russian First League players